Black River Killer is an EP by American band Blitzen Trapper, released on August 25, 2009. It features previously released track "Black River Killer" from their 2008 album, Furr, as well as 6 songs previously unreleased.

The 12" version was released on October 6, 2009.

Track listing 
All songs written by Eric Earley.

References

2009 EPs
Blitzen Trapper albums
Sub Pop EPs